Ayr railway station is located on the North Coast line in Queensland, Australia. It serves the town of Ayr. The station has one platform. Opposite the platform lies a passing loop.

Ayr and Home Hill are the two closest stations on the North Coast line, being only 11 kilometres apart.

Services
Ayr is served by Traveltrain's Spirit of Queensland service. Until December 31, 2014, Ayr was a timetabled stop for the Spirit of Queensland's predecessor, The Sunlander

References

External links

Ayr, Queensland
North Queensland
Regional railway stations in Queensland
North Coast railway line, Queensland